Permata Bank (or Bank Permata) is a bank in Indonesia, headquartered in the capital city Jakarta. It has officially become a BUKU IV bank after receiving confirmation from the Financial Services Authority (OJK) on 20 January 2021. Serving nearly four million customers in 62 cities in Indonesia, it has 304 branch offices and two mobile branches; currently, the bank is led by Meliza Musa Rusli as the CEO.

History 

Bank Permata was formed with merger of five banks under the management of the Indonesian Bank Restructuring Agency (IBRA), namely:
 PT Bank Bali Tbk - established in 1954, then center of a corruption scandal;
 PT Bank Universal Tbk;
 PT Bank Prima Express;
 PT Bank Artamedia; and
 PT Bank Patriot.

Based on the Decree of the Deputy Governor of Bank Indonesia No. 4/159/KEP.DpG/2002 dated 30 September 2002, Bank Indonesia approved the merger of the four banks under the management of IBRA into Bank Bali. Furthermore, based on the Letter of the Deputy Governor of Bank Indonesia No. 4/162/KEP.DpG/2002 dated 18 October 2002, Bank Indonesia agreed to change the name of PT Bank Bali Tbk to PT Bank Permata Tbk. The operational merger of Bank Artamedia was carried out on October 21, 2002, while Bank Prima Express on November 4, 2002, Bank Universal on November 18, 2002 and Bank Patriot on December 16, 2002. The merger process was completed followed by the launch of the Bank Permata logo on February 18, 2003. The Bank Permata logo consists of three colors, namely blue, red and green. Blue represents eternity, red represents passion, and green represents prosperity.

The merger of the five banks is an implementation of the Government's decision regarding the Advanced Restructuring Program issued on 22 November 2001, which aims to form a bank with a strong capital structure, sound financial condition and high competitiveness in carrying out an intermediation function, with a service network. a wider range and a wider range of products.

In 2004, Standard Chartered Bank and PT Astra International Tbk took over PermataBank and started a massive transformation process within the organization. Furthermore, as a manifestation of its commitment to PermataBank, the joint ownership of the major shareholders increased to 89.01% in 2006.

Bank Permata Tbk obtained a license as a commercial bank based on the Decree of the Minister of Finance No.19371 / U.M.II dated 19 February 1957.

Bangkok Bank Strategic Investment
On 13 December 2019, Thailand's largest financial group, Bangkok Bank announced plans to acquire majority ownership of Bank Permata through conditional sale and purchase agreements with Astra International and Standard Chartered Bank. After going through a long process, PermataBank made a new history in May 2020 through an acquisition transaction conducted by Bangkok Bank Public Company Limited ("Bangkok Bank"). Bangkok Bank officially became the controlling shareholder of PermataBank after taking over 89.12% of PermataBank's shares from the total number of shares that had been issued and paid up by Standard Chartered Bank and Astra International for Rp33.66 trillion (US$2.3 billion).

Shareholders

Subsidiaries

Current 
 PT Sahabat Finansial Keluarga - Consumer Finance

Former  
 PT Sarana Bali Ventura - Venture Capital
 PT Sarana Bersama Pengembangan Indonesia - Investment (in liquidation)
 PT Aplikanusa Lintasarta - Communication
 PT Kustodian Sentral Efek Indonesia - Capital Market

Board of Commissioner and Board of Directors

Board of Commissioner 
 President Commissioner: Chatsiri Sophonpanich
 Commissioner: Chong Toh
 Commissioner: Niramarn Laisathit
 Commissioner: Chalit Tayjasanant
 Independent Commissioner: Haryanto Sahari
 Independent Commissioner: Rahmat Waluyanto
 Independent Commissioner: Goei Siauw Hong
 Independent Commissioner: Yap Tjay Soen

Board of Directors 
 President Director: Meliza Musa Rusli
 Compliance Director: Dhien Tjahajani
 Finance Director: Lea Setianti Kusumawijaya
 HR Director: Dayan Sadikin
 Tech & Ops Director: Abdy Dharma Salimin
 Wholesale Banking: Darwin Wibowo
 Retail Banking: Djumariah Tenteram
 Sharia Banking Director: Herwin Bustaman
 Risk Director: Setiatno Budiman

See also
 Bank Indonesia
 List of banks in Indonesia

References

External links
 

1954 establishments in Indonesia
1990 initial public offerings
Bangkok Bank
Banks of Indonesia
Banks established in 1954
Companies listed on the Indonesia Stock Exchange